Suzdalsky (masculine), Suzdalskaya (feminine), or Suzdalskoye (neuter) may refer to:
Suzdalsky District, a district of Vladimir Oblast, Russia
Suzdalskaya, a rural locality (a stanitsa) in Krasnodar Krai, Russia